Ostbahn may refer to:
 Austrian Eastern Railway (Ostbahn), a former railway company in the Austrian Empire and Austria-Hungary
 Eastern Railway (Austria) (Austrian Ostbahn), a railway line in Austria, initially operated by Austrian Eastern Railway
 Bavarian Eastern Railway Company (Bavarian Ostbahn), a former railway company in Bavaria, Germany
 Prussian Eastern Railway (Prussian Ostbahn), a railway line in Prussia, part of the former German Empire
 Württemberg Eastern Railway (Württemberg Ostbahn), a railway line in Württemberg, Germany
 SC Ostbahn XI, an association football club based in Vienna, Austria
 Ostbahn, German railway administration in occupied Poland (General Government) during World War II

See also 
 Eastern Railway (disambiguation)
 Østbanen (disambiguation)